The Cedar Mountains of Tooele County, Utah, USA, are a 45-mile (72 km)  long mountain range located in the county's east, bordering east sections of the Great Salt Lake Desert on the range's west and southwest flanks.

The range contains the Cedar Mountain Wilderness, and lies between Skull Valley on its east and southeast, and the Great Salt Lake Desert on its west and southwest.

Description
The Cedar Mountains contain a 30-mi (48 km) due-north trending north section, and a 15-mi (24 km) southeast trending section. The range is only moderate elevation 6000+ ft in the north, 5000+ ft in the southeast, but contains numerous springs on all its foothills.

Three mountain passes  dissect the range. Hastings Pass and North Cedar Loop Road access an extreme north region.

Peaks and range center

The midpoint of the entire range is near Quiney Spring on the range's west flank.

Access
The north region of the Cedar Mountains can be accessed from Interstate 80 from Delle on the east, and Low and Aragonite on the west. For the north 30-mi section: from Aragonite, Hastings Pass Road accesses Hastings Pass; from Hastings Pass Road, Cedar Mountain Road follows the west perimeter foothills south to West Cedar Flats Road. South Valley Road from Skull Valley intersects after going over Rydalch Pass, Rydalch Canyon.

The south 15-mi section can be accessed from Dugway and south Skull Valley. Utah State Route 196 goes north from Dugway; S. Cedar Mountain Road follows the northeast foothills of the range, (Post Hollow Road exits west from Utah 196).

References

External links

Quiney Spring (approx. range center-N to S) (coordinates)
Tabbys Peak, at mountainzone
Tabbys Peak (north), with Skull Valley, topo section (Topoquest)
Tabbys Peak (south), with Skull Valley, topo section (Topoquest)

Great Salt Lake Desert
Mountain ranges of Tooele County, Utah
Mountain ranges of the Great Basin
Mountain ranges of Utah